Lori Ostlund is an American short story writer. She graduated from Minnesota State University, Moorhead and from the University of New Mexico with an M.A. 
She teaches at The Art Institute of California – San Francisco.

Her work appeared in The Georgia Review, New England Review, The Kenyon Review, Prairie Schooner, Bellingham Review, Hobart, and Blue Mesa Review.

She lives in San Francisco, with her partner, the novelist Anne Raeff.

Awards
 2008 Flannery O'Connor Award for Short Fiction
 2009 Rona Jaffe Foundation Writers' Award
 2010 Edmund White Award

Works
"Idyllic Little Bali", Prairie Schooner, Summer 2009
"The Bigness of the World", Bellingham Review, Issue 61
"And Down We Went", Five Chapters
 
 After the Parade.

References

External links
"Author's website"
"Interview - Lori Ostlund", Story in Literary Fiction

American short story writers
Writers from Minnesota
Minnesota State University Moorhead alumni
University of New Mexico alumni
Living people
American lesbian writers
American women short story writers
Rona Jaffe Foundation Writers' Award winners
Year of birth missing (living people)
21st-century American women writers